The 1971 NBA draft was the 25th annual draft of the National Basketball Association (NBA). The draft was held on March 29 and 30, 1971 before the 1971–72 season. In this draft, 17 NBA teams took turns selecting amateur U.S. college basketball players and other eligible players, including international players. A player who had finished his four-year college eligibility was eligible for selection. If a player left college early, he would not be eligible for selection until his college class graduated. The first two picks in the draft belonged to the teams that finished last in each conference, with the order determined by a coin flip. The Cleveland Cavaliers won the coin flip and were awarded the first overall pick, while the Portland Trail Blazers were awarded the second pick. The remaining first-round picks and the subsequent rounds were assigned to teams in reverse order of their win–loss record in the previous season. Prior to the start of the season, the San Diego Rockets and the San Francisco Warriors relocated to Houston, Texas, and Oakland, California, and became the Houston Rockets and Golden State Warriors respectively. The draft consisted of 19 rounds comprising the selection of 237 players. The league also hosted a supplemental hardship draft on September 20, 1971, for college underclassmen who wished  to join the league.

Draft selections and draftee career notes
Austin Carr from the University of Notre Dame was selected first overall by the Cleveland Cavaliers. Sidney Wicks from the University of California, Los Angeles, who went on to win the Rookie of the Year Award in his first season, was selected second by the Portland Trail Blazers.

Spencer Haywood, the 30th pick, and Randy Smith, the 104th pick, were selected to both the All-NBA Team and the All-Star Game. Haywood was selected to four All-NBA Teams and five All-Star Games. He also won the NBA championship with the Los Angeles Lakers in 1980. During his first and only season in the American Basketball Association (ABA), he won the ABA Most Valuable Player Award, and was selected to the ABA All-Star Game and All-ABA Team. Smith was selected to one All-NBA Team and two All-Star Games.

Artis Gilmore, the 117th pick, initially opted to play in the ABA. Gilmore spent five seasons with the Kentucky Colonels before finally joined the NBA in 1976 after both leagues merged. His achievements include ABA Most Valuable Player Award in 1972, five All-ABA Team selections, five ABA All-Star Game selections and six NBA All-Star Game selections. For his achievements, he was inducted to the Basketball Hall of Fame in 2011.

Fred Brown, the 6th pick, spent all of his 13-year playing career with the Sonics and was selected to one All-Star Game. Carr, Wicks, and 11th pick Curtis Rowe are the only other players from this draft who were selected to an All-Star Game. Phil Chenier, a college underclassman selected in the supplemental hardship draft, was also selected to both All-NBA Team and All-Star Game. Two players drafted went on to have coaching careers in the NBA: 13th pick Jim Cleamons and 46th pick Dave Wohl.

Spencer Haywood was selected in the second round by the Buffalo Braves although he already played in the NBA with the Seattle SuperSonics in the previous season. He left college basketball in 1969 with two years remaining in his college eligibility. At that time, the NBA prohibited the drafting or signing of a player before his college class had graduated. He then played in the ABA with the Denver Rockets for a season before controversially signed by the Sonics. The league and the other NBA teams opposed the move and argued Haywood should be prohibited to join and play with the Sonics. This led to a court case between the NBA against the Sonics and Haywood. He argued that he should be allowed to play because he was a "hardship case", due to his position as the sole wage earner in his family. He then won the case and was allowed to play late in the 1970–71 season. This led to the NBA allowing college underclassmen to enter the draft provided they could give evidence of "hardship". With the existing rules, Haywood was eligible for this year's draft, when his college class graduated. The Braves used one of their three second-round picks to select him, hoping that they would win the rights to sign him. However, he remained with the Sonics and never played for the Braves.

Key

Draft

Other picks
The following list includes other draft picks who have appeared in at least one NBA game.

Trades
 On October 20, 1970, the Chicago Bulls acquired a second-round pick from the Portland Trail Blazers in exchange for Shaler Halimon. The Bulls used the pick to draft Willie Sojourner.
 On March 23, 1971, the Portland Trail Blazers acquired 1971 and 1972 second-round picks and a 1971 third-round pick from the San Francisco Warriors in exchange for Jim Barnett. The Blazers used the picks to draft Charlie Yelverton and William Smith.
 On October 22, 1970, the Portland Trail Blazers acquired a second-round pick from the Baltimore Bullets in exchange for Dorie Murrey. The Blazers used the pick to draft Rick Fisher.
 On May 11, 1970, the Buffalo Braves acquired Bob Kauffman and a second-round pick from the Philadelphia 76ers in exchange for Bailey Howell. The Braves used the pick to draft Spencer Haywood.
 On the draft-day, the Cincinnati Royals acquired a second-round pick from the Los Angeles Lakers in exchange for Flynn Robinson. The Royals used the pick to draft Joe Bergman.
 On April 23, 1970, the Chicago Bulls acquired Jim Fox and a second-round pick from the Phoenix Suns in exchange for Clem Haskins. The Bulls used the pick to draft Howard Porte.
 On October 16, 1970, the Philadelphia 76ers acquired a second-round pick from the Chicago Bulls in exchange for Matt Guokas. The 76ers used the pick to draft Marvin Stewart.
 On February 1, 1971, the Cleveland Cavaliers acquired Gary Freeman and a second-round pick from the Milwaukee Bucks in exchange for McCoy McLemore. The Cavaliers used the pick to draft Willie Long.
 On September 5, 1969, the Chicago Bulls acquired Bob Kauffman and a third-round pick from the Seattle SuperSonics in exchange for Bob Boozer and Barry Clemens. The Bulls used the pick to draft Clifford Ray.
 On December 9, 1970, the Cleveland Cavaliers acquired a third-round pick from the San Diego Rockets in exchange for Johnny Egan. The Cavaliers used the pick to draft Jackie Ridgle.
 On September 9, 1969, the Chicago Bulls acquired a third-round pick from the Los Angeles Lakers in exchange for Mike Lynn. The Bulls used the pick to draft Mike Gale.

Hardship draft

On September 10, 1971, the NBA hosted a supplemental hardship draft for college underclassmen who wish to join the league. Prior to the 1971 Draft, college underclassmen were not eligible to be drafted until their college class graduated. These underclassmen fulfilled the "hardship" criteria and were allowed to enter the draft early. This new rule came as a result of Spencer Haywood winning the court case against the NBA which allowed him to play in the NBA before his college class graduated. The teams selected in reverse order of their win–loss record in the previous season. The team that made a selection must withdraw their equivalent selection in the 1972 Draft. The teams were allowed to not exercise their rights on this hardship draft and thus retained their full selection in the 1972 Draft.

Three teams that were supposed to have the first three selections, the Cleveland Cavaliers, Buffalo Braves and Portland Trail Blazers, declined to exercise their rights. Therefore, the Cincinnati Royals had the first selection, which they used to select Nate Williams from Utah State University. Phil Chenier, a junior guard from the University of California, was selected by the Baltimore Bullets. He is the only player from the hardship draft who was selected to All-NBA Team and All-Star Game. Joe Hammond, who had not played high school and college basketball, was selected in the fourth round by the Los Angeles Lakers. Hammond, who had played for the Allentown Jets in the Eastern Basketball Association (EBA) prior to the draft, had to apply as the "hardship case" because his college class could not graduate until 1972 if he had gone to the college. From the six players that were available for selection, only Ed Owens from Weber State University was not selected by any NBA team.

See also
 List of first overall NBA draft picks

References
General

Specific

External links
NBA.com
NBA.com: NBA Draft History

Draft
National Basketball Association draft
NBA draft
NBA draft
Basketball in New York City
Sporting events in New York City